Hon or HON may refer to:

People 
 Han (surname) (Chinese: 韩/韓), also romanized Hon
 Louis Hon (1924–2008), French footballer
 Priscilla Hon (born 1998), Australian tennis player

Other uses 
 Hon (Baltimore), a cultural stereotype of working-class women from Baltimore, Maryland, United States
 Cafe Hon, a restaurant in Baltimore
 Hon, Arkansas, a community in the United States
 Hands on Network, an American network of volunteer centers
 Health On the Net Foundation, a Swiss non-governmental organization
 Heroes of Newerth, a 2010 video game
 Høn Station, in Asker, Norway
 The HON Company, an American business furniture manufacturer
 Honduras at the Olympics
 Honeywell (NYSE stock symbol: HON), an American multinational corporation
 Honorary (disambiguation)
 The Honourable, an honorific styling
 Huron Regional Airport, in South Dakota, United States
 On (biblical figure) (or Hon), a minor biblical figure
 Hon, a term of endearment, short for "honey"